The Roosevelt elk (Cervus canadensis roosevelti), also known commonly as the Olympic elk and Roosevelt's wapiti, is the largest of the four surviving subspecies of elk (Cervus canadensis) in North America by body mass. Mature bulls weigh from 700 to 1200 lbs. with very rare large bulls weighing more. Its geographic range includes temperate rainforests of the Pacific Northwest including parts of northern California. It was introduced to Alaska's Afognak, Kodiak, and Raspberry Islands in 1928 and reintroduced to British Columbia's Sunshine Coast from Vancouver Island in 1986.

In December 1897, mammalogist C. Hart Merriam named the species after his friend Theodore Roosevelt, then Assistant Secretary of the US Navy. The desire to protect the Roosevelt elk was one of the primary forces behind the establishment of the Mount Olympus National Monument in 1909 by President Theodore Roosevelt. Later in 1937, President Franklin D. Roosevelt visited the region and saw the elk named after his relative. The following year he created Olympic National Park.

Description
The Roosevelt elk grows to around 6–10 ft (1.8–3 m) in length and stands 2.5–5.6 ft (0.75–1.7 m) tall at the withers. Roosevelt elk bulls generally weigh between 700 and 1,100 lb (300–500 kg), while cows weigh 575–625 lb (260–285 kg).  Some mature bulls from Raspberry Island in Alaska have weighed nearly 1,300 lb (600 kg).

Although the largest elk subspecies by body mass, by antler size both the Boone and Crockett (rifle) and Pope and Young (bow) records have Rocky Mountain elk being larger; none of the top 10 Roosevelt elk would score in the top 20 of Pope and Young's Rocky Mountain elk.

Diet
From late spring to early fall, the Roosevelt elk feeds upon herbaceous plants, such as grasses and sedges.  During winter months, it feeds on woody plants, including highbush cranberry, elderberry, devil's club, and newly planted seedlings (Douglas fir and western redcedar). The Roosevelt elk is also known to eat blueberries, mushrooms, lichens, and salmonberries.

Longevity
In the wild, the Roosevelt elk rarely lives beyond 12 to 15 years, but in captivity it has been known to live over 25 years.

Reintroduction
This elk subspecies, Cervus canadensis roosevelti, was reintroduced to British Columbia's Sunshine Coast from Vancouver Island in 1986.

See also
Dean Creek Elk Viewing Area
Manitoban elk
Rocky Mountain elk
Tule elk

References

Further reading
Merriam CH (1897). "Cervus roosevelti, a New Elk from the Olympics". Proceedings of the Biological Society of Washington 11: 271–275. (Cervus roosevelti, new species, "Roosevelt's Wapiti").

External links
Return of the elk to the B.C. Lower Mainland

Elk and red deer
Fauna of the Western United States
Endemic fauna of the Pacific Northwest